World B. Free (born Lloyd Bernard Free; December 9, 1953) is a retired American professional basketball player who played in the National Basketball Association (NBA) from 1975 to 1988. Free was known as the "Prince of Mid-Air", "Brownsville Bomber", and most often as "All-World".

Early years
Born in Atlanta, Free grew up in Brownsville, New York and attended Canarsie High School in Brooklyn, New York before attending Guilford College in North Carolina. As a freshman, he led Guilford's basketball team and helped the team win the NAIA National Championship and was named MVP of the NAIA Tournament.

Professional career
Free played for the San Diego Clippers, Philadelphia 76ers, Golden State Warriors, Cleveland Cavaliers and Houston Rockets in the National Basketball Association. He got his name from his days in Brooklyn, where a friend nicknamed him "World" because of his 44-inch vertical leap and 360 degree dunks. Free was known for his "rainbow" jump shots, referring to the extreme arch of the ball during the shot. He was also known for taking high risk shots and playing flamboyantly. During Free's time playing for the San Diego Clippers, fans would shout "shoot, shoot, shoot" whenever Free took possession of the ball. Free averaged 20.3 points per game over 13 seasons in the NBA.

For both the 1978–79 and 1979–80 campaigns, George Gervin and Free were number 1 and 2 in the league in scoring. In 1979, Free led the Clippers to an improved 43–39 record, but they narrowly missed the playoffs. His best statistical season was 1979–80 with the Clippers, averaging 30.2 points per game, as well as 4.2 assists per game and 3.5 rebounds per game in 68 games. He was an All-Star that season as well, although the Clippers failed to make the playoffs again.

On on August 28, 1980, San Diego traded Free to Golden State for Phil Smith and a first-round pick. During the 1981-82 NBA season, Free would help the Warriors to a 45–37 record, leading the team in assists per game at 5.4 while also scoring 22.9 points per game (second on the team only to Bernard King’s 23.2 per game average). However, despite their above .500 record, they would miss the postseason.

During the  season, Free became the 39th player in league history to surpass 15,000 career points. During that year, now on the Cavaliers, Free made the playoffs for the first time since he was on the 76ers, and averaged career-playoff-highs of 26.3 points and 7.8 assists per game, during a 3-1 first round loss to the Celtics. In that series, Free led the Cavaliers to a 105-98 Game 3 win with a postseason-career-high 32 points.

Free later played in the United States Basketball League (USBL) for the Miami Tropics after being waived by the Philadelphia 76ers in March 1987. He was named the USBL Playoffs MVP after leading the Tropics to the title after scoring 30 points in the championship winning game against the Rhode Island Gulls. Following the USBL season, he joined the Houston Rockets for the 1987–88 season, which was his last NBA season. For Free, the highlight of that season was November 12, 1987, when he scored 38 points against the Sacramento Kings at ARCO Arena and brought the Rockets back to win the game.

In 1991, Free had a comeback with Atlanta Eagles of the USBL, before retiring permanently.

Player profile
Free loved to go one-on-one against a defender and either whirl around him or take a jump shot. His shot was possibly his greatest strength: a soft, high-arcing lob that stayed in the air longer than the average jump shot and was so straight when he was "on" that it barely jostled the net. When he was younger, on the playgrounds of New York City, his jump shot was a flat line drive, but he was tired of having the ball blocked, so he developed a new style of shooting.

Free admired Muhammad Ali.

Name change
On December 8, 1981, a day before his 28th birthday, he legally changed his first name to World.  According to Free, "the fellas back in Brownsville gave me the nickname 'World' when I was in junior high... they just started calling me 'all-world', because all-city and all-county and things like that weren't good enough.  Finally they just started calling me World... I'm still the same guy I was when I was Lloyd, though.  I'll say what I'm going to do, and then I'll go out and do it."

Post-playing career
Currently, Free is director of player development and a community ambassador for the Philadelphia 76ers. Among other things, he greets fans at 76ers home games in his flamboyant/colorful wardrobe. Free has also led the Sixers' "Summer Hoops Tour". On November 30, 2005, Free was honored as a Cleveland Cavaliers Legend at halftime of the Cavaliers game against the Los Angeles Clippers. On March 26, 2022, Free was honored with a spot on the Cavaliers Wall of Honor along with former players Lenny Wilkens and Campy Russell and former owner Gordon Gund. Dick Vitale often uses his name in college basketball season previews to give the award for best name.

NBA career statistics

Regular season 

|-
| style="text-align:left;"| 
| style="text-align:left;"|Philadelphia
| 71 || – || 15.8 || .448 || – || .602 || 1.8 || 1.5 || 0.5 || 0.1 || 8.3
|-
| style="text-align:left;"| 
| style="text-align:left;"|Philadelphia
| 78 || – || 28.9 || .457 || – || .720 || 3.0 || 3.4 || 1.0 || 0.3 || 16.3
|-
| style="text-align:left;"| 
| style="text-align:left;"|Philadelphia
| 76 || – || 27.0 || .455 || – || .731 || 2.8 || 4.0 || 0.9 || 0.5 || 15.7
|-
| style="text-align:left;"| 
| style="text-align:left;"|San Diego
| 78 || – || 37.9 || .481 || – || .756 || 3.9 || 4.4 || 1.4 || 0.4 || 28.8
|-
| style="text-align:left;"| 
| style="text-align:left;"|San Diego
| 68 || – || 38.0 || .474 || .360 || .753 || 3.5 || 4.2 || 1.2 || 0.5 || 30.2
|-
| style="text-align:left;"| 
| style="text-align:left;"|Golden State
| 65 || – || 36.5 || .446 || .161 || .814 || 2.4 || 5.6 || 1.3 || 0.2 || 24.1
|-
| style="text-align:left;"| 
| style="text-align:left;"|Golden State
| 78 || 78 || 35.8 || .448 || .179 || .740 || 3.2 || 5.4 || 0.9 || 0.1 || 22.9
|-
| style="text-align:left;"| 
| style="text-align:left;"|Golden State
| 19 || 18 || 36.8 || .451 || .000 || .711 || 2.3 || 4.7 || 0.8 || 0.2 || 22.8
|-
| style="text-align:left;"| 
| style="text-align:left;"|Cleveland
| 54 || 51 || 35.9 || .458 || .357 || .747 || 2.9 || 3.7 || 1.5 || 0.2 || 24.2
|-
| style="text-align:left;"| 
| style="text-align:left;"|Cleveland
| 75 || 71 || 31.7 || .445 || .319 || .784 || 2.9 || 3.0 || 1.3 || 0.1 || 22.3
|-
| style="text-align:left;"| 
| style="text-align:left;"|Cleveland
| 71 || 50 || 31.7 || .459 || .368 || .749 || 3.0 || 4.5 || 1.1 || 0.2 || 22.5
|-
| style="text-align:left;"| 
| style="text-align:left;"|Cleveland
| 75 || 75 || 33.8 || .455 || .420 || .780 || 2.9 || 4.2 || 1.2 || 0.3 || 23.4
|-
| style="text-align:left;"| 
| style="text-align:left;"|Philadelphia
| 20 || 2 || 14.3 || .317 || .222 || .766 || 1.0 || 1.5 || 0.3 || 0.2 || 5.8
|-
| style="text-align:left;"| 
| style="text-align:left;"|Houston
| 58 || 0 || 11.8 || .409 || .229 || .800 || 0.8 || 1.0 || 0.3 || 0.1 || 6.4
|- class="sortbottom"
| style="text-align:center;" colspan="2"| Career
| 886 || 345 || 30.4 || .456 || .337 || .753 || 2.7 || 3.7 || 1.0 || 0.3 || 20.3
|- class="sortbottom"
| style="text-align:center;" colspan="2"| All-Star
| 1 || 1 || 21.0 || .538 || –|| .000 || 3.0 || 5.0 || 0.0 || 1.0 || 14.0

Playoffs 

|-
|style="text-align:left;"|1976
|style="text-align:left;”|Philadelphia
|3||–||20.7||.393||–||.769||0.3||1.7||1.0||0.0||10.7
|-
|style="text-align:left;"|1977
|style="text-align:left;”|Philadelphia
|15||–||18.7||.371||–||.688||2.1||1.9||0.8||0.5||11.9
|-
|style="text-align:left;"|1978
|style="text-align:left;”|Philadelphia
|10||–||26.8||.411||–||.728||3.1||3.7||0.4||0.6||16.1
|-
|style="text-align:left;"|1985
|style="text-align:left;”|Cleveland
|4||4||37.5||.441||.000||.920||2.5||7.8||1.5||0.0||26.3
|-
|style="text-align:left;"|1988
|style="text-align:left;”|Houston
|2||0||6.0||.000||.000||–||1.0||0.5||0.5||0.0||0.0
|- class="sortbottom"
| style="text-align:center;" colspan="2"| Career
| 34 || 4 || 22.7 || .398 || .000 || .740 || 2.2 || 3.0 || 0.7 || 0.4 || 14.0

See also
List of National Basketball Association career free throw scoring leaders
Metta World Peace

References

External links
World B. Free page at databaseBasketball.com
Philadelphia 76ers page
Cavshistory.com page

1953 births
Living people
20th-century African-American sportspeople
21st-century African-American people
African-American basketball players
American men's basketball players
Basketball players from Atlanta
Canarsie High School alumni
Cleveland Cavaliers players
Golden State Warriors players
Guilford Quakers men's basketball players
Houston Rockets players
National Basketball Association All-Stars
People from Canarsie, Brooklyn
Philadelphia 76ers draft picks
Philadelphia 76ers players
Point guards
San Diego Clippers players
Shooting guards
Sportspeople from Brooklyn
Basketball players from New York City
United States Basketball League players